This is a list of child actors from Canada. Films and/or television series they appeared in are mentioned only if they were still a child at the time of filming.

Current child actors (under the age of eighteen) are indicated by boldface.

A 
Jessica Amlee (born 1994)
They (2002)
My Life Without Me (2003)
SuperBabies: Baby Geniuses 2 (2004)
The Love Crimes of Gillian Guess (2004)
Chestnut: Hero of Central Park (2005)
Absolute Zero (2005) 
Reflection (2005)
Eve and the Fire Horse (2005)
Barbie and the Magic of Pegasus 3-D (2005) 
Final Destination 3 (2006)
Beneath (2006)
Gene Andrusco (born 1961)
Bewitched (1971)
The Amazing Chan and the Chan Clan (1972)
Magda Apanowicz (born 1985)

B 
Alexandra Beaton (born 1994)
300 (2006)
Jessica Barker (born 1977)
Le Chemin de Damas (1988)
Simon Les Nuages also known as Simon and the Dreamhunters (1990)
Une Nuit à L'École (1991)
Love Crazy (Amoureux fou) (1991)
Le Jardin d'Anna (1992)
Les Intrépides also known as The Intrepids (1993)
Matusalem (1993)
Jay Baruchel (born 1982)
 Popular Mechanics for Kids (1997)
Sophie Bennett (born 1989)
The Saddle Club (2001–2003)
Daniela Bobadilla (born 1993)
Mr. Troop Mom (2009)
Justin Bradley (born 1985)
Mona the Vampire (1999)
Arthur (2001–2002)
Stefan Brogren (born 1972) 
Degrassi Junior High and Degrassi High (1987–1991)
Genevieve Buechner (born 1991)
Saint Monica (2002)
The Final Cut (2004)
The 4400 (2004–2005)
Bob the Butler (2005)

C 
 Peggy Cartwright (1912–2001)
 Michael Cera (born 1988)
Arrested Development (2003–06)
 Tara Charendoff (born 1973)
Mosquito Lake (1989–90)
Hayden Christensen (born 1981)
Star Wars: Episode II - Attack of the Clones (2002)
Star Wars: Episode III - The Revenge of the Sith (2005)
Carol Coombs (born 1935)
It's a Wonderful Life (1946)

D 
Molly Dunsworth (born 1990)
Deeply (2000)

E 
Aryana Engineer (born 2001)
Orphan (2009)
Resident Evil: Retribution (2012)
Myles Erlick (born 1998)
Flashpoint (2011)
The Next Step (2013–2018, 2020)

F 
Jodelle Ferland (born 1994)
Mermaid (2000)
The Linda McCartney Story (2000)
Special Delivery (2000)
Wolf Lake (2001)
Trapped (2001)
The Miracle of the Cards Deadly Little Secrets (2001)
Carrie (2002)
10.5 (2004)
Too Cool for Christmas (2004)
Tideland (2005)
Silent Hill (2006)
The Messengers (2007) 
The Twilight Saga: Eclipse (2010)
Carrie Finlay (born 1986)
Mona the Vampire (1999)
Michael J. Fox (born 1961)
Leo and Me (1976)
Dark Matter (TV Series) (2015-2017)

G 
Alasdair Gillis (born 1971)
You Can't Do That on Television (1982–1986)
Ryan Gosling (born 1980)
Mickey Mouse Club (1993–1995)
Dakota Goyo (born 1999)
Ultra Brett (2006)
Resurrecting the Champ (2007)
Emotional Arithmetic (2007)
Solving Charlie (2009)
Defendor (2009)
Arthur (2010–2012)
Thor (2011)
Real Steel (2011) 
Rise of the Guardians (2012)

H 
Corey Haim (1971–2010)
Lucas (1986)
The Lost Boys (1987)
Neil Hope (1972–2007) 
Kids of Degrassi Street (1985–1987), Degrassi Junior High (1987–1989) and Degrassi High (1989–1991)
Tyler Hynes (born 1986)
Home Team (1998)
Betty & Coretta (2013)

J 
 Lisa Jakub (born 1978)
Eleni (1985)
Mrs. Doubtfire  (1993)
Matinee (1993)
A Child's Cry for Help (1994)
Picture Perfect (1995)
The Beautician and the Beast (1997)
Avan Jogia (born 1992)
A Girl Like Me: The Gwen Araujo Story (2006)
The Diary (2007)
Aliens in America (2007)
Gym Teacher: The Movie (2008)
Spectacular! (2008)
Caprica (2008)
 Alessandro Juliani (born 1975)
Captain N: The Game Master (1989–1991)

L 
Antoine L'Écuyer (born 1997)
It's Not Me, I Swear! (C'est pas moi, je le jure!) (2008)
Pour toujours, les Canadiens! (2009)
Sarah-Jeanne Labrosse  (born 1991)
Le Volcan Tranquille (1997)
Summer with the Ghosts (2003)
15/Love (2005–2006)
Aurore (2005)
Human Trafficking (2005)
Bon Cop, Bad Cop (2006)
Charlotte Laurier (born 1966)
Good Riddance (1980)
The Tin Flute (1983)
Hannah Lochner (born 1993)
Dawn of the Dead (2004)
G-Spot (2005–2006)
Firehouse Dog (2007)
Life with Derek (2007)
The Gathering (2007)
Quinn Lord (born 1999)
Trick 'r Treat (2008)
Edison and Leo (2008)
Smallville (2007)
Erica Luttrell (born 1982)
Shining Time Station (1991–1995)

M 
Keenan MacWilliam (born 1989)
The Saddle Club (2001–2003)
Ari Magder (1983–2012)
Shining Time Station (1991–1995)
Chris Makepeace (born 1964)
Meatballs (1979)
My Bodyguard (1980)
Danielle Marcot (born 1983)
Shining Time Station (1991–1995)
Pat Mastroianni (born 1971)
Degrassi Junior High and Degrassi High (1987–1991)
Rachel McAdams (born 1978)
Mean Girls (2004)
Miriam McDonald (born 1987)
Degrassi: The Next Generation (2001–2010)
Christine McGlade (born 1963)
You Can't Do That on Television (1979–1986)
Jane McGregor (born 1983)
The Odyssey (1994)
So Weird (1999)
Live Through This (2000)
Britt McKillip (born 1991)
Baby Looney Tunes (2002–2005)
Dead Like Me (2003–2004)
Sammy McKim (1924-2004)
Annie Oakley (1935)
San Francisco (1936)
Mr. Smith Goes to Washington (1939)
Lee Montgomery (born 1961)
The Million Dollar Duck (1971)
Ben (1972)
Burnt Offerings (1976)
Alanis Morissette (born 1974)
You Can't Do That on Television (1986)
Mike Myers (born 1963)
Wayne's World (1992)
Austin Powers: International Man of Mystery (1997)
Shrek (2001)

N
Briar Nolet (born 1998)
The Next Step (2014–present)
An American Girl: Isabelle Dances Into the Spotlight (2014)

O
Chloe O'Malley (born 2001)
Northpole (2014)
The Strain (2014–17)

P 
Jack Pickford (1896–1933)
The Kid (1910) 
The Newlyweds (1910) 
The Smoker (1910)
The Modern Prodigal (1910) 
Muggsy Becomes a Hero (1910) 
In Life's Cycle (1910) 
The Oath and the Man (1910) 
Examination Day at School (1910) 
The Iconoclast (1910) 
Two Little Waifs (1910) 
A Plainsong (1910) 
A Child's Stratagem (1910) 
The Lesson (1910) 
His Trust Fulfilled (1911) 
The Poor Sick Men (1911) 
White Roses (1911) 
A Decree of Destiny (1911) 
The Stuff Heroes are Made Of (1911) 
The Massacre (1912)
Kate Katchem (1912)
A Dash Through the Clouds (1912)
The School Teacher and the Waif (1912)
An Indian Summer (1912)
What the Doctor Ordered (1912)
A Child's Remorse (1912)
The Inner Circle (1912)
Mr. Grouch at the Seashore (1912)
A Pueblo Legend (1912)
A Feud in the Kentucky Hills
The Painted Lady
The Musketeers of Pig Alley
Heredity
My Baby
The Informer
Brutality
The New York Hat
My Hero
A Misappropriated Turkey (1913) 
Love in an Apartment Hotel (1913) 
The Unwelcome Guest (1913)
Home, Sweet Home (1914)
Sarah Polley (born 1979)
The Adventures of Baron Munchausen (1988)
Road to Avonlea (1990–1994)
Connor Price (born 1994)
Sins of the Father (2002)
The Save-Ums! (2003) 
Cinderella Man (2005)
The Dead Zone (2007)
Good Luck Chuck (2007)
Roxy Hunter and the Horrific Halloween (2008)
What's Up Warthogs! (2011)

R 
Adam Reid (born 1973)
You Can't Do That on Television (1984–1987)
Lisa Ruddy (born 1967)
You Can't Do That on Television (1979–1985)
John Paul Ruttan (born 2001)
Against the Wild 2: Survive the Serengeti (2016)
RoboCop (2014)
Colleen Rennison (born 1987)
Carpool (1996)
The Story of Us (1999)

S 
Klea Scott (born 1968)
You Can't Do That on Television (1982–1984)
Noah Ryan Scott (born 2000)
Booky and the Secret Santa (2007)
Siluck Saysanasy (born 1974) 
Degrassi Junior High and Degrassi High (1987–1991)
Gregory Smith (born 1983)
  Small Soldiers, Harriet the Spy, the Patriot
Amanda Stepto (born 1970) 
Degrassi Junior High and Degrassi High (1987–1991)
Cassie Steele (born 1989)
Degrassi: The Next Generation

T

Emma Taylor-Isherwood (born 1987)
Mona the Vampire (1999–2003) 
Strange Days at Blake Holsey High (2002–2006)
Sally Taylor-Isherwood (born 1991)
Arthur (2004–2022)
Emily Tennant (born 1990)
Scooby-Doo 2: Monsters Unleashed (2004)
I, Robot (2004)
Jennifer's Body (2009)
Triple Dog (2010)
Christian Tessier (born 1978)
You Can't Do That On Television (1989–1990) 
The Tomorrow People (1992–1995)
Jacob Tremblay (born 2006)
Room (2015)
Before I Wake (2016)
Burn Your Maps (2016)
Shut In (2016)
The Book of Henry (2017)
Wonder (2017)
The Predator (2018)
The Death & Life of John F. Donovan (2018)
Good Boys (2019)
The Little Mermaid (2023)
Kate Todd (born 1987)
Radio Free Roscoe (2003–2005)

W 

Aaron Webber (born 1989)
A Summer Fling (2004)
Whole New Thing (2005)
A Stone's Throw (2006)
Finn Wolfhard (born 2002)
Aftermath (2013)
The Resurrection (2013)
The 100 (2014)
Supernatural (2015)
Stranger Things (2016–present)
It (2017)
Dog Days  (2018)

Z 
Noam Zylberman (born 1973)
The Raccoons (1985-1990)

Kevin Zegers (born 1984)
Air Bud film series (1997–2002)

Canada

nl:Lijst van kindsterren